Jwala Prasad Kureel (15 July 1915 – 25 February 1991) was MP of the 6th Lok Sabha in 1977, affiliated with Janata Party. He was elected for the  constituency of Ghatampur, Kanpur Dehat, Uttar Pradesh.

Career
The son of Shri Raja Ram, Kureel was born on 15 July 1915.

Kureel was MP of the 6th Lok Sabha in 1977, elected for the constituency of Ghatampur, Kanpur Dehat. He was Urdu and Hindi Middle; m. Smt. Mohini, and Smt. Indrani;  agriculturist.
 Kureel was a teacher from 1935 to 1943; 
 Previously associated with Congress. 
 Convener, Harijan Sub-Committee of District Congress Committee, Kanpur, 1946. 
 Member, Provincial Congress Committee, Uttar Pradesh.  
 Secretary, District Congress Committee, Kanpur 1953. 
 General Secretary, District Congress Committee, Kanpur, 1955. 
 President, District Congress Committee, Kanpur, 1959–65. 
 Vice-President, District Congress Committee, Kanpur till 1976. 
 Convener, Kargha Association, Kanpur 1947. 
 Secretary and President Zila Dalit Varg Sangh-Kanpur, 1947–49. 
 Secretary, Prantiya Sangh; Member, [(I) Bhoodan Yajna Samiti, Kanpur, 1974, (II) Bhoomiheen Khetihar Mazdoor Sangh, Kanpur from 1974]. 
 Member, Uttar Pradesh Legislative Assembly, 1957–62, 1962—67 and 1969–74.

References

India MPs 1977–1979
Janata Party politicians
1915 births
1991 deaths
Uttar Pradesh MLAs 1957–1962
Uttar Pradesh MLAs 1962–1967
Uttar Pradesh MLAs 1969–1974
Lok Sabha members from Uttar Pradesh
People from Kanpur Dehat district
Bharatiya Lok Dal politicians
Indian National Congress politicians from Uttar Pradesh